Andrea Larini (born 2 December 1968) is an Italian auto racing driver. He is the younger brother of fellow racing driver Nicola Larini.

Career 
Larini raced in Italian F3 in the early 1990s. In 2005 he raced in the Italian Superturismo Championship. He also raced in three rounds of the World Touring Car Championship. He raced in the Italian Alfa Romeo 147 Cup in 2006. In 2008 he began competing in the SEAT León Eurocup, finishing the championship in 15th. He continued in the Eurocup in 2009, and was the highest points-scorer at Motorsport Arena Oschersleben. This won him a drive for SUNRED Engineering in the World Touring Car Championship at Imola. 
Race= Viva la topa 2005
Winner first place.

Racing record

Complete World Touring Car Championship results
(key) (Races in bold indicate pole position) (Races in italics indicate fastest lap)

NASCAR
(key) (Bold – Pole position awarded by qualifying time. Italics – Pole position earned by points standings or practice time. * – Most laps led.)

Whelen Euro Series - Elite 1

References

1968 births
Living people
Sportspeople from the Province of Lucca
Italian racing drivers
Italian Formula Three Championship drivers
World Touring Car Championship drivers
SEAT León Eurocup drivers
Superstars Series drivers
European Touring Car Cup drivers
Audi Sport drivers
NASCAR drivers
Zengő Motorsport drivers
TCR Europe Touring Car Series drivers